Maney is an unincorporated community in St. Louis County, in the U.S. state of Minnesota.

The community was named for E. J. Maney, a railroad official.

References

Unincorporated communities in St. Louis County, Minnesota
Unincorporated communities in Minnesota